RC Dinamo-Center is a Moldovan rugby club in Tiraspol. They currently play in the Ukraine Rugby Superliga, despite the city being located in within the borders of Moldova.

Moldovan rugby union teams